Nile Gardiner is a British  conservative commentator. He is director of the Margaret Thatcher Center for Freedom at The Heritage Foundation, and was for a time an aide to former British Prime Minister Margaret Thatcher. He is also a commentator on U.S. and British television; he is a frequent contributor to the Fox News network and to the London Daily Telegraph. Gardiner is co-author with Stephen Thompson of the book, Margaret Thatcher on Leadership: Lessons for American Conservatives Today (Regnery 2013).

Education
Gardiner holds a doctorate in History and two master's degrees from Yale University, as well as a bachelor's and master's degree in Modern History from Oxford University. He was awarded several scholarships at Yale, including the International Security Studies Smith Richardson Foundation Fellowship, and the David Gimbel Fellowship.

Career
Following Yale, Gardiner served as a foreign policy researcher and aide to former British prime minister Margaret Thatcher, assisting her as she wrote Statecraft: Strategies for a Changing World. In 2002, he became a Heritage Foundation fellow in Washington, D.C., specializing in Anglo-American security policy. He was appointed director of  Heritage's Margaret Thatcher Center for Freedom in 2006.

In addition to transatlantic relations, Gardiner also has an interest in the United Nations. Having been a supporter of an investigation into the Oil for Food Program, he also advised the 2005 Gingrich-Mitchell Task Force on the United Nations.

Gardiner worked as a foreign policy adviser for Rudy Giuliani's 2008 presidential campaign, specializing in Europe and transatlantic relations.

Gardiner has been interviewed as a pundit on many television news programs, including Fox News, NBC Nightly News, NewsHour with Jim Lehrer, and Washington Journal amongst others. He has written for leading publications in the United States, Europe and Asia such as The Daily Telegraph, The Wall Street Journal, and Süddeutsche Zeitung. He is also an occasional contributor to The New York Times “Room for Debate” forum.

Gardiner joined Senator Ted Cruz's National Security Coalition on 17 March 2016.

Opinions
Gardiner is a supporter of the Transatlantic alliance and the idea that the U.S. and U.K. should "project power and influence across the world.”

Gardiner supported the 2003 invasion of Iraq and Afghanistan and has defended the George W. Bush administration's record in warfare and in combatting terrorism. Gardiner is opposed to increasing European integration and the rise of a federal Europe, which he sees as a threat to British sovereignty and the future of the Anglo-American alliance.
In his articles on domestic U.S. politics, Gardiner has praised and appealed to the Tea Party movement in American political debate, calling it the most influential political movement of the decade.

Gardiner was a prominent and long-time supporter of the withdrawal of the UK from the European Union from his position at the Heritage Foundation, and hosted key talks in support before the British vote on 23 June 2016. As someone who worked for Margaret Thatcher he maintained, "The Iron Lady believed firmly that Britain would be better off outside the European Union."

References

External links
 

The Heritage Foundation
Yale Graduate School of Arts and Sciences alumni
Alumni of the University of Oxford
Living people
British columnists
The Daily Telegraph people
Year of birth missing (living people)